2017 was a year in the Gregorian calendar.

2017 may also refer to:

2017 (number)
"2017" (song), by Rasmus Seebach
"2017" (Parks and Recreation), a 2015 episode